Tony Spyridakos (born 9 April 1964) is an Australian former soccer player who played as a midfielder.

Club career
After playing for Pierikos in Greece Spyridakos spent time with Sydney Olympic in the Australian National Soccer League.

International career
Spyridakos represented Australia at the 1983 FIFA World Youth Championship, listed by FIFA under the name Anthony Dakos.

Spyridakos made his full international debut for Australia in August 1990 in a match against Indonesia in Jakarta. He played his second and final international against South Korea in Seoul in September 1990.

References

Living people
1964 births
Australian soccer players
Association football midfielders
Australia international soccer players
Pierikos F.C. players